The Box: How the Shipping Container Made the World Smaller and the World Economy Bigger is a non-fiction book by Marc Levinson charting the historic rise of the intermodal container (shipping container) and how it changed the economic landscape of the global economy. The New York Times called it "a smart, engaging book".

The book inspired the name for the project "The Box" run by BBC News from September 2008 onwards, in which the BBC were tracking a container for a period of one year.

The Box won a bronze medal in the Independent Publisher Book Awards (2007) in the "Finance/Investment/Economics" category. It also won the 2007 Anderson Medal from the Society for Nautical Research. The Box was shortlisted for the Financial Times and Goldman Sachs Business Book of the Year Award (2006).

Editions

References

American non-fiction books
Intermodal containers